Baker Township is a township in Crawford County, Kansas, United States.  As of the 2010 census, its population was 3,408.

Geography
Baker Township covers an area of  surrounding the city of Pittsburg and a small part of the city of Frontenac.  According to the USGS, it contains three cemeteries: Dietz, Frontenac and West Union.

The streams East Cow Creek, First Cow Creek and Second Cow Creek run through this township.

References

 USGS Geographic Names Information System (GNIS)

External links
 City-Data.com

Townships in Crawford County, Kansas
Townships in Kansas